"Su Su Su Super キ・レ・イ" (Rōmaji: "Kirei" meaning "beautiful") is a Scatman John single, recorded in Japan with Japanese backing musicians and released there as a tie-in to a cosmetics commercial. The song was his highest-charting single in Japan, reaching no. 16. The song is based on a series of catchy loops of party lyrics. The B-side is a solo piano cover of the Elvis Presley song "Love Me Tender", dubbed the "L.A. Unplugged Mix".

The commercials feature a slightly different mix of the track and feature Scatman speaking Japanese and promoting the product in a variety of situations, interacting with the Japanese performers. There were 4 different commercials in total, the 2nd and 4th being slight variations on the 1st and 3rd.

There was also a music video for this track. It begins with Scatman producing a bunch of flowers like a magic trick, and goes on to show Scatman riding around in a circle on a miniature trike. Later shots show Scatman dancing in a CGI kitchen and in what looks like a cellar. Unlike all other Scatman John music videos, it was never officially uploaded to Youtube, though a few unofficial uploads exist.

Single track listing

Personnel
Keyboard, producer: Tsugutoshi Goto
Synthesizer: Mituji Horikawa
Electric guitar: Masaki Suzukawa
Keyboard: 
Chorus: Mai Yamane
Recorded by Masahiko Kokubo
Mixed by Yosinori Kaji
Cover design by Akihiro Ijima

Scatman John songs
1996 singles
Oricon International Singles Chart number-one singles
1996 songs
RCA Records singles